Underclassman is a 2005 American action comedy film directed by Marcos Siega and starring Nick Cannon, Shawn Ashmore, Roselyn Sánchez, Kelly Hu, Hugh Bonneville, and Cheech Marin. It was released on September 2, 2005, had been originally set for a release in 2004. The film was a critical and box office disaster, receiving only a 6% rating on Rotten Tomatoes and grossing $5.6 million on a production budget of $25,000,000.

Plot
Tracy "Tre" Stokes (Nick Cannon) is a 23-year-old bike cop working for the Los Angeles Police Department. Tre dreams of being a police detective, like his late father, but his mentor Captain Delgado (Cheech Marin) believes he is not ready based on his reckless behavior. While playing basketball, Delgado is approached by a representative of the Mayor's office looking to place an undercover detective into the prestigious Westbury School after a student was killed at a party. Tre volunteers to go undercover, and Delgado reluctantly agrees to give him a chance.

Tre's mark is Rob Donovan (Shawn Ashmore), whose name was written on a piece of paper at the scene of the crime. Attempting to befriend Rob on the basketball court after school, Tre learns about a local basketball tournament, the Blacktop Battle, which Rob is captaining for Westbury. Tre arrives at the Blacktop Battle where Westbury is being handily defeated by their crosstown rival. Joining the game, Tre wins the game and impresses Rob, but antagonizing his friends with his selfish play. The next day Tre learns of a party at the marina that Rob routinely throws, and shows up with a borrowed jetski for a race. When a former student and rival of Rob's shows up at the party there is a fight and Tre and Rob are thrown in jail where they form a bond.

Tre soon discovers that at every high school party in the area a luxury car seems to be stolen. Tre plans a sting involving throwing his own party at Captain Delgado's home using the Captain's prized '65 Corvette Stingray, Juanita, as bait. Tre sees Rob steal the car, but allows him to escape instead of stopping him, resulting on him getting fired from the force. Continuing the investigation himself, Tre discovers that the cars have been housed at a warehouse on campus and that Rob and his friends have been forced to steal the cars against their will. Headmaster Felix Powers (Hugh Bonneville), realizing Tre is an undercover cop, enlists his co-conspirators to kidnap and murder Tre at the Blacktop Battle championship game. Tre is abducted along with Karen and they are brought to the campus warehouse to be killed while Powers goes to the docks to trade the stolen vehicles for drugs. Tre, with the help of backup, escapes and interrupts Powers’ drug deal and rescues Karen. Tre then kills Powers during a high speed boat chase in the harbor. In the end Tre graduates high school and is reinstated to the force.

Cast
Nick Cannon as Tracy "Tre" Stokes
Roselyn Sánchez as Karen Lopez
Kelly Hu as Lisa Brooks
Ian Gomez as Det. Gallecki
Shawn Ashmore as Rob Donovan
Hugh Bonneville as Headmaster Felix Powers
Cheech Marin as Captain Victor Delgado
Johnny Lewis as Alexander Jeffries
Angelo Spizzirri as David Boscoe
Vishiss as Edward Murdock
Adrian Young as Jose
Don McManus as Julian Reynolds
Mary Pat Gleason as Mrs. Hagerty
Peter Bryant as Michael Barry
Sam Easton as Oliver Horn
Kaylee DeFer as Des
Terry Chen as Sleepy Morris
Jamie Kaler as Beach Police Officer
Ben Cotton as Raver
Zak Santiago as Anderson
Dan Shea as Weston
Sarah Jane Morris as Jamie (uncredited)

Production
In June 2003, music video director Marcos Siega was announced as director of Underclassman. Shawn Ashmore joined the cast in August 2003.

Reception

Box office
Underclassman was released on Labor Day weekend (September 2) in 2005, and performed poorly at the box office opening at number 11 with $3,393,610. Overall Underclassman earned just $5,655,459 against a budget of $25 million in seven weeks of release.

Critical response
Underclassman received universal negative reviews from critics. On Rotten Tomatoes, only 6% of the critics gave it positive write-ups with the consensus: "Despite the appealing presence of Nick Cannon, Underclassman is a shopworn knockoff of both Beverly Hills Cop and 21 Jump Street." On Metacritic the film has received 20 poor and 5 medium reviews for an overall score of 19. Underclassman is currently the sixth worst reviewed film on Metacritic released in 2005.

References

External links

2005 films
2005 comedy films
2005 drama films
2005 comedy-drama films
2000s high school films
2000s police comedy films
2000s teen comedy films
American comedy-drama films
American crime comedy films
American high school films
American police detective films
American teen comedy films
Fictional portrayals of the Los Angeles Police Department
Films directed by Marcos Siega
Films scored by BT (musician)
Films set in Los Angeles
Films shot in Vancouver
Miramax films
2000s English-language films
2000s American films